NGC 2812 is a lenticular galaxy in the constellation Cancer.  It was discovered by Albert Marth on February 17, 1865.

References

External links 
 

Lenticular galaxies
Unbarred lenticular galaxies
Cancer (constellation)
2812
26242